Dactylispa albopilosa, is a species of leaf beetle found in India, Sri Lanka, and Nepal.

It is a pest of Sorghum bicolor.

References 

Cassidinae
Insects of Sri Lanka
Beetles described in 1888